The Bluford Series is a widely read collection of contemporary American young adult novels set in the fictional inner-city high school of Bluford High in Southern California. Bluford is named for Guion "Guy" Bluford, the first  African-American astronaut. The series was created and published by Townsend Press and was co-distributed by Scholastic. As part of an effort to promote reading in underfunded school districts, Townsend Press originally made the Bluford Series available to schools for a dollar each. As of 2018, over 11 million Bluford Series novels were in print.

Synopsis 
The Bluford Series is set in Bluford High School, the fictional school all the main characters attend. Each novel features a teenage protagonist facing difficult challenges in and out of school. Topics explored in the books include bullying, school violence, teenage pregnancy, divorce, peer pressure, and substance abuse. Despite these gritty topics, the Bluford Series has been praised widely for its engaging stories and responsible handling of difficult subject matter, earning positive reviews in Kirkus Reviews, School Library Journal, and the Journal of Adolescent & Adult Literacy.  While each novel in the Bluford Series can be read independently, the books are interconnected and represent a span of about two years at Bluford High.

Reception 
Reception for The Bluford Series has been positive, with the ALA picking many of the books in the series as "Quick Picks for Reluctant Young Adult Readers". The ALA also selected Bluford titles as "Popular Paperbacks". Educators in many states, including Florida and New York, have noted that the series has been well received by their student population.

Of Brothers in Arms (Bluford Series #9), the Journal of Adolescent & Adult Literacy wrote that the book's themes were applicable to struggling teens." Kirkus Reviews called Survivor (Bluford Series #20), "a brave young-adult novel" and said the Bluford Series "offers unflinchingly honest plot situations to engage and educate readers". Similarly, School Library Journal called Promises to Keep (Bluford Series # 19), "compassionate, insightful, and educational, along with being action-packed, realistic, and emotionally and psychologically accurate". Favorable reviews for many Bluford titles can be found in Kirkus Reviews. In addition, The Horn Book singled out the Bluford Series as "perennially popular among urban teens" and listed three Bluford titles as "Good YA Urban Novels."

Other mentions 
 An August 2022 article from DeKalb County, GA detailing a popular and successful "school-wide reading program" that uses the Bluford Series to promote literacy and classroom engagement. 
 An October 2021 article in Medium discusses how the Bluford Series has moved readers of color to  "to read, write and imagine".
 The Bluford Series is called "a revelation" and credited in a June 2020 article in Education Week for playing a key role in encouraging reluctant readers to read and finish their first book.  
 The Bully, a novel in the Bluford Series, is cited by educator/scholar Gerald Dessus for sparking a lifelong interest in reading and teaching. The article appeared in a February 2020 post in Literacy Now, a publication of the International Literacy Association.
 The Bluford Series is mentioned in a 2018 story in the Atlanta Journal-Constitution as being a centerpiece to promote literacy in the Atlanta metro area's public schools.
 Survivor was selected by the American Library Association/Young Adult Library Service Association (YALSA) as a 2014 Quick Pick for Reluctant Young Adult Readers. It was also chosen as a "Top 10" for 2014 by In the Margins, a publication that seeks books suited to the interests and challenges of marginalized teens.
 Search for Safety was selected by the American Library Association/Young Adult Library Service Association (YALSA) as a 2013 Popular Paperback.
 The Bluford Series was part of a 15-week study on the effectiveness of young adult literature as a therapeutic approach to students with emotional and behavioral disorders. This study was published in the April 2012 edition of the Journal of Adolescent and Adult Literacy and showed the Bluford Series to be a powerful catalyst to help students learn constructive behaviors in and out of the classroom. Full citation: Verden, C. E. (2012), Reading Culturally Relevant Literature Aloud to Urban Youths With Behavioral Challenges. Journal of Adolescent & Adult Literacy, 55: 619–628. doi: 10.1002/JAAL.00073
 Breaking Point, The Test and Pretty Ugly were selected by the American Library Association/Young Adult Library Service Association (YALSA) as 2012 Quick Picks for Reluctant Young Adult Readers.
 The Gun (published by Scholastic as "Payback") was chosen by the American Library Association/Young Adult Library Service Association (YALSA) as a 2012 Popular Paperback.
 No Way Out and Schooled were selected by the American Library Association/Young Adult Library Service Association (YALSA) as 2009 Quick Picks for Reluctant Young Adult Readers.
 Blood Is Thicker was selected by Mayor Daley's Book Club for a citywide reading initiative in Chicago in 2009.
 The Bully has been chosen by districts in multiple states for school-wide reading programs. It is also featured in Books That Don't Bore 'Em by James Blasingame, associate professor of English at Arizona State University and a former editor of The ALAN Review. Blasingame currently edits the "Books for Adolescents" pages of the Journal of Adolescent and Adult Literacy.
 In 2009 and 2010, Accelerated Reader listed the first 15 titles of the Bluford Series in the “top 40” books for both middle and high school struggling readers.
 Over 50,000 reviews for Bluford Series titles are available now on Goodreads. Search results for "Bluford series" (showing 1-20 of 30 books).
 More than 10 million Bluford novels are in print as of 2015.
 The Bluford Series has been credited with helping to popularize "Street Literature" as a genre for young adults. While the Bluford Series lacks some of the explicit content found in adult "Street Lit," its focus on urban life and the challenges of inner city teens has earned it a mention in Dr. Vanessa Irwin Morris's The Readers' Guide to Street Literature and on the website, http://www.streetliterature.com.

Titles

Reading order of the series

Year 1 
The Darcy Wills and Classmates Sequence:
Lost and Found (Darcy Wills-sophomore-October)
A Matter of Trust (Darcy Wills-sophomore)
Secrets in the Shadows (Roylin Bailey-sophomore)
Until We Meet Again (Darcy Wills-sophomore-June)
Blood Is Thicker (Hakeem Randall-Darcy's boyfriend-June)
Summer of Secrets (Darcy Wills-July)
Survivor (Tarah Carson-August)
Shattered (Darcy Wills-junior-September)
The Chosen (Darcy Wills-junior-September)

The Martin Luna Sequence:
Brothers in Arms (Martin Luna-sophomore-July–September)
The Fallen (Martin Luna-sophomore-October)
Breaking Point (Vicky Fallon-Martin's new girlfriend-sophomore October)

Year 2 
The Jamee Wills and Classmates Sequence:
Girls Like Me (Angel McAllister-eight grade-June)
Pretty Ugly (Jamee Wills-Darcy Wills' younger sister-freshmen-September)
Schooled (Lionel Shepard-freshmen-October)
Someone to Love Me (Cindy Gibson-freshmen-October)
The Bully (Darrell Mercer-new freshmen-November to January)
The Gun (Payback) (Tyray Hobbs-freshmen)
Promises to Keep (Tyray Hobbs-freshmen-)
No Way Out (Harold Davis-freshmen-March)
Search for Safety (Ben McKee-new sophomore-August and September)
The Test (Liselle Mason-January)

References

External links 
  A Black journalist discusses the Bluford Series and its impact on her as an emerging reader, writer, and young adult. Published in Medium in October 2021.
  Description of the power of the Bluford Series to encourage reading among reluctant teens from Education Week in June 2020.
  Description of a literacy program using the Bluford Series in Atlanta, GA from October 8, 2018.
 A Washington Post  listing of recommended summer reading for teens from June 2, 2015.
 An interview with Paul Langan, editor/co-author of the Bluford Series from The Juvenile Justice Literacy Project on May 27, 2015
 A review from School Library Journal from May 13, 2013
 A Horn Book article from October 24, 2013
 Bluford Audiobooks
 Brief description of the books in the Bluford Series
 Publisher's website
 A New York Times article from March 29, 2011
 A review of a Bluford novel from Kirkus Reviews

Book series introduced in 2002
American novel series
Urban fiction